After Life is a play by Jack Thorne (concept by Thorne, Bunny Christie, and Jeremy Herrin) based on the film of the same name by Hirokazu Kore-eda.

Production history 
The play made its world premiere in the Dorfman Theatre at the Royal National Theatre, London from 2 June 2021, running until 7 August, It is directed by Jeremy Herrin, designed by Bunny Christie and co-produced by Headlong. The production was originally due to open in 2020, however was postponed due to the COVID-19 pandemic. The audience are socially distanced due to the Government guidelines.

The cast includes Olatunji Ayofe, Nino Furuhata, Danielle Henry, Maddie Holliday, Togo Igawa, Anoushka Lucas, Kevin McMonagle, Jack James Ryan, Simon Startin, Luke Thallon, June Watson and Millicent Wong.

References 

2021 plays
British plays
Plays based on films